The 1889 South Australian Football Association season was the 13th season of the top-level Australian rules football competition in South Australia.

As  and  finished level on premiership points, the first ever dedicated premiership playoff match in a major Australian rules football competition was held, with  winning to claim the 1889 premiership.

Adelaide merged with North Adelaide, the former Hotham and no relation to the current team, after North Adelaide had spent one season in the S.A.F.A.

Minor Round

Round 1

Round 2

Round 3

Round 4

Round 5

Round 6

Round 7

Round 8

Round 9

Round 10

Round 11

Round 12

Round 13

Round 14

Round 15

Round 16

Round 17

Round 18

Round 19

Round 20

Ladder

Grand final

1889 SAFA Premiership Football Match

References 

SANFL
South Australian National Football League seasons